Vladimir Sergeevich Lukyanov (born 18 August 1945) is a Russian architect, painter and graphic artist.

Lukyanov was born in Leningrad and educated at the Saint Petersburg Art and Industry Academy.  Early in his career he designed buildings and facilities for Siberia and the Far North, influenced by his graduate school professor, architect Alexander Shipkov.  Lukyanov's most notable architectural work are his memorials.  In both his architecture and visual arts Lukyanov takes on neo-classical themes and style.

Lukyanov has been a member of the Union of Soviet Architects since 1980.  His wife Tatyana V. Lukyanov is a noted artist.

 See: The Lukyanov family Tree (ru.)

Work 

Lykyanov's major work includes:

  Leningrad Hero City Obelisk, Vosstaniya Square, St. Petersburg, with A. I. Alymov, 1985 
  multiple "Our Daily Bread" monuments along the Road of Life (Rzhevskij Corridor), commemorating the Siege of Leningrad, 1985
A water based computer

References 

1945 births
Living people
Russian architects
Soviet architects
Saint Petersburg Stieglitz State Academy of Art and Design alumni